Vernonia unicata is a species of flowering plant in the aster family that is endemic to Yemen. Its natural habitat is subtropical or tropical dry forests.

References

unicata
Endemic flora of Socotra
Vulnerable plants
Taxonomy articles created by Polbot